The PGA of Austria Masters was a one-off golf tournament on the Challenge Tour played in September 2001 at Golf Eichenheim in Kitzbühel, Austria.

Winners

References

External links
Coverage on the Challenge Tour's official site

Former Challenge Tour events
Golf tournaments in Austria